This list of British journalism awards is an index to articles about notable awards given to journalism in the United Kingdom.

Awards

See also
 Lists of awards
 List of journalism awards

References

 
British